Mesophleps palpigera is a moth of the family Gelechiidae. It is found in Ivory Coast, Niger, Nigeria, Zaire, Uganda, Kenya, Malawi, Mozambique, Madagascar and South Africa. Records from outside of Africa are based on misidentifications.

The wingspan is 9–15.5 mm. The forewings are yellowish brown to light ochreous brown.

The larvae feed on Bauhinia, Parkinsonia aculeata, Acacia, Albizia altissimum, Albizia lebbeck, Cajanus cajan, Crotalaria retusa, Lonchocarpus cyanescens, Millettia zechiana, Pericopsis laxiflora, Tephrosia bracteolata.

References

Moths described in 1891
Mesophleps
Moths of Africa